Shimun Vrochek, real name Dmitry S. Ovchinnikov (born 1 November 1976) is a Russian science fiction author. His work Piter (a novel from the Universe of Metro 2033 book series) has been cited as a case study of the boom in prosumer level participation in Russian fan fiction, using transmedia in ways that echo traditional Soviet methods, yet is completely commodified.

Life and career
Vrochek was born in the Northern Urals, in the Kungur region and grew up in Nizhnevartovsk. He graduated from Gubkin Russian State University of Oil and Gas, then enrolled in graduate school but did not complete his studies.

He has been a writer since 2001. In 2003 he began studying acting at Russian Academy of Theatre Arts. He then studied directing at the Boris Shchukin Theater Institute under Leonid Heifetz. He is best known as the author of Piter, a novel from the Metro 2033 universe. All of his works were originally written in Russian, though some of them have been translated to other languages. Piter has been translated to a number of European languages – such as German, Polish and Spanish.

In 2006, Мир Фантастики honored his work as "best national collection." That year, his short story collection Serzhantu Nikto Ne Zvonit won the Golden Caduceus at the Kharkiv International Fiction Festival (nicknamed the Star Bridge festival).

Selected publications
 Nobody Calls the Sergeant (Сержанту никто не звонит), 2006
 Wild Talent (Дикий Талант) (co-author), 2009
 Piter (Вселенная Метро 2033: Питер), 2010
 Tango Iron Heart (Танго железного сердца), 2011
 Latin K. 1. – Last Legat (Рим. К. 1. Последний Легат), part of Etnogenez project, 2011
 Uber and the Revolution (Вселенная Метро 2033: Убер и все-все-все). The Last Refuge (Вселенная Метро 2033: Последнее убежище), 2011 (novella)
 Latin K. 2. – The Legions Ask for Fire (Рим. К. 2. Легионы просят огня), 2015 
 Piter. War. (Вселенная Метро 2033: Питер. Война.), 2018
 The Golden Bullet (Золотая пуля), co-authored with Yuriy Nekrasov, 2019
 How to Survive Among Princesses (Как выжить среди принцесс), collection of short stories, 2019
 Piter. Battle of the Twins (Вселенная Метро 2033: Питер. Битва близнецов), 2019

References 

1976 births
Living people
Russian writers